NST may refer to:

Health
 Nonstress test, a screening test used in pregnancy test

Media
 Niigata Sogo Television, a television company in Niigata Prefecture, Japan
 New Straits Times, an English-language newspaper published in Malaysia
 New Sabah Times, a newspaper in Sabah, Malaysia

Military 

 Naval Security Team (NST), a deployable Royal Canadian Navy (RCN) force protection unit tasked to augment fleet existing force protection measures in expeditionary or domestic environments.

Science and engineering
 National Standard Thread, a thread form used on fire hose couplings in the USA
 Natural Sciences Tripos, a  courses system of the University of Cambridge
 Neon-sign transformer, a high voltage transformer
 Neural Style Transfer, a non-realistic rendering technology

Time zones
 National Standard Time, Taiwan
 Nepal Standard Time
 Newfoundland Standard Time

Transportation
 Nakhon Si Thammarat Airport, Thailand, IATA code

Other uses
 NST (company), UK travel group
 Network Security Toolkit, a live Linux CD
 New standard tuning for guitar
 Nintendo Software Technology, a video game company
 Non-sellable token, a type of scam seen in cryptocurrency
 State of East Sumatra (Negara Sumatera Timur), a former federal state